Aur Kaun? is a 1979 Bollywood horror film directed by Shyam Ramsay and Tulsi Ramsay. The music of the film composed by Bappi Lahiri was popular in 1979, especially the song "Haan Pehli Baar" sung by Kishore Kumar. The title song was sung by Lata Mangeshkar in her haunting melody style.

Plot 
Raj loves with his college mate Komal. One day he is seduced by an elderly lady teacher Mona. Mona is found dead in Raj's house.

Cast 
Roopesh Kumar
Madan Puri
Sachin
Om Shivpuri as Ram Saroop
Sachin as Raj
Rajni Sharma as Komal
Padmini Kapila as Mona

Songs 
The songs were composed by Bappi Lahiri.

References

External links 
 

Hindi-language horror films
1979 films
1970s Hindi-language films
1979 horror films
Indian horror films
Films scored by Bappi Lahiri
Indian slasher films
1970s slasher films
Films directed by Shyam Ramsay
Films directed by Tulsi Ramsay